The University of Central Florida is a metropolitan public research university located on a  main campus in Orlando, Florida, United States. UCF is a member institution of the State University System of Florida and is the second-largest university in the United States.

Metropolitan Orlando sustains the world's largest recognized cluster of modeling, simulation and training companies, and the university has made noted research contributions to optics, modeling and simulation, digital media, engineering and computer science, business administration, education and hospitality management. The UCF Office of Research & Commercialization is responsible for the organization and administration of the university's research centers, institutes and partners. The Office is located directly south of the main campus in the Central Florida Research Park, which is one of the largest research parks in the nation. Providing more than 10,000 jobs, the Research Park is the largest research park in Florida, the fourth largest in the United States by number of companies, and the seventh largest in the United States by number of employees. Collectively, UCF's research centers and the park manage over $5.5 billion in contracts annually.

Significant research also takes place on UCF's Health Sciences Campus in Lake Nona. The campus includes the university's College of Medicine and Burnett School of Biomedical Sciences, as well as the Sanford-Burnham Medical Research Institute, M.D. Anderson Orlando Cancer Research Institute, and a University of Florida Academic and Research Center. It is estimated that the campus will create up to 30,000 jobs and have a $7.8 billion economic impact by 2020.

Research centers and institutes

Advanced Materials Processing and Analysis Center
Biomolecular Science Center
Center for Advanced Turbomachinery and Energy Research
Center for Advanced Transportation Systems Simulation
Center for Advancing Faculty Excellence
Center for Engineering Leadership and Learning
Center for Emerging Media
Center for Research and Education in Optics and Lasers
Center for Research in Computer Vision
Coastal Hydroscience Analysis, Modeling & Predictive Simulations Lab (CHAMPS)
College of Optics and Photonics
Dick Pope, Sr. Institute for Tourism Studies
Environmental Systems Engineering Institute
Florida Advanced Manufacturing Research Center
Florida Energy Systems Consortium: Energy Conversion Research
Florida Interactive Entertainment Academy
Florida Photonics Center of Excellence
Florida Power Electronics Center

Florida Sinkhole Research Institute
Florida Solar Energy Center
Florida Space Institute
Interdisciplinary Information Science and Technology Lab
Institute for Advanced Systems Engineering (IASE)
Institute for Economic Competitiveness
Institute for Simulation and Training
LAN Institute
Lou Frey Institute of Politics and Government
M.D. Anderson Cancer Research Institute
NanoScience Technology Center
National Center for Forensic Science
National Center for Simulation
Progress Energy Leadership Institute
Sanford-Burnham Medical Research Institute
Stormwater Management Academy
Townes Laser Institute
Transportation Systems Institute
Wekiva Resource Council

References

External links
UCF Office of Research & Commercialization

University of Central Florida
Research institutes in Florida